Pimento (Brooklyn Nine-Nine) may refer to:

 "Pimemento", an episode of the seventh season of Brooklyn Nine-Nine
 "Adrian Pimento" (Brooklyn Nine-Nine episode), an episode of the third season of Brooklyn Nine-Nine
 Adrian Pimento, a character of Brooklyn Nine-Nine